The women's 63 kilograms event at the 2015 World Weightlifting Championships was held on 24 and 25 November 2015 in Houston, United States.

Schedule

Medalists

Records

Results

New records

References

Results 

2015 World Weightlifting Championships
World